Chen Jun (born October 1956) is a Chinese geographer and formerly director and chief engineer of the National Geomatics Center of China (NGCC). He was president of the International Society for Photogrammetry and Remote Sensing (ISPRS) between 2012 and 2016. He served two separate terms as president of the China Association for Geographic Information Society (CAGIS) from 1999 to 2003 and 2003 to 2007. He is a member of the China Land Science Society (CLSS).

Biography
Chen was born in Huoqiu County, Anhui, in October 1956. During the Down to the Countryside Movement, he taught at Daimao Middle School. In September 1975 he joined the Anhui Provincial Department of Surveying and Mapping as a worker. He arrived in France in 1981 to begin his education at the Institut géographique national on government scholarship and returned to China one year later. He taught at his alma mater between 1983 and 1995, what he was promoted to associate professor in 1987 and to full professor in 1992. In December 1995 he was transferred to the National Geomatics Center of China (NGCC), where he successively served as deputy director (1995–1998), acting director (1998–2000), and director (2000–2014). He also served as chief engineer at the center.

Honours and awards
 2000 National Science Fund for Distinguished Young Scholars
 2003 Academician of the Eurasian Academy
 2017 Academician of the International Academy of Astronautics (IAA)
 November 22, 2019 Member of the Chinese Academy of Engineering (CAE)

References

1956 births
Living people
People from Huoqiu County
Engineers from Anhui
Wuhan University alumni
Chinese geographers
Members of the Chinese Academy of Engineering